Depth of Field is the sixth studio album by ARIA award-winning Australian singer-songwriter Sarah Blasko. The album was released in Australia on 23 February 2018 through EMI.

Reception
Everett True from The Guardian gave the album 5/5 saying "The songs on Blasko's sixth album feel possessed of a dark undercurrent, the sort of edge that comes around after you have spent one too many late-night hours waiting for your partner to return home from carousing." adding "These are as great as any Australian pop I have heard, from Kylie Minogue to The Easybeats."

Dan Condon said "Depth of Field is an intimate look at the darkness that pervades modern relationships [and it's] proof that Blasko is still pushing into new and exciting creative corners."

Track listing
 "Phantom" - 4:29
 "A Shot" - 4:21
 "Never Let Me Go" - 3:44
 "Everybody Wants to Sin" - 3:50
 "Heaven Sent" - 4:10
 "Making It Up" - 4:30
 "Savour It" - 4:03
 "Another" - 3:22
 "Read My Mind" - 4:24
 "Leads Me Back" - 4:13

Charts

References

2018 albums
Sarah Blasko albums